Kwäday Dän Tsʼìnchi, or Canadian Ice Man, is a naturally mummified body found in Tatshenshini-Alsek Provincial Park in British Columbia, Canada, by a group of hunters in 1999. Kwäday Dän Tsʼìnchi means "Long Ago Person Found" in Southern Tutchone, and is pronounced  in that language. Radiocarbon dating of artifacts found with the body placed the age of the body at between 300 and 550 years.  

DNA testing of more than 240 volunteers from the local Champagne and Aishihik First Nations revealed 17 persons who are related to the ice man through their direct maternal line.

Discovery
Three sheep hunters, Bill Hanlon, Warren Ward and Mike Roche, discovered a number of artifacts and a human body in a melting glacier while hunting near the Yukon border on July 22, 1999. The hunters were walking along a glacier, above the treeline, and noticed some bits of wood, which they thought unusual given their location. They examined the wood, and noticed carvings and notches, possibly indicating the wood formed the frame of a backpack. Searching with binoculars, Ward discovered the body in the ice. On August 16, the party reported their find to Yukon archaeology department staff, and turned in a number of artifacts they collected from the site.

Before making a public announcement, the archaeologists notified representatives of the Champagne and Aishihik First Nations, whose historical territory is here. They visited the site and decided to name the person Kwäday Dän Tsʼìnchi, which means Long Ago Person Found. A team of archeologists was assembled to assess the find, and the First Nations were further consulted about the project. They supported having scientific studies done, including DNA analysis.

Description
The remains had been dismembered after death, probably by shifting ice due to thermal cracking and slumping along the edge of the glacier. The first part found was the torso, with left arm and mummified hand still attached. The lower body was found a few meters away, with the thighs and muscle still attached. The head was missing, as were the right arm and lower right leg, though his hair, attached to some remnants of the scalp, and some small bones from the right hand and foot were recovered. Soft tissue was present primarily in the torso and thighs. The torso was of particular interest, as gastric contents could be analyzed to yield clues to the days leading up to the man's death. The skull was located in 2003, but was not removed from the site for study.

The young man was estimated to be approximately 18–19 years old at his time of death. The cause of death is unknown, but there appears to be no sign of serious injury, and hypothermia is a possibility. He died near the onset of the Little Ice Age. Based on pollen found in the contents of his colon, he was traveling in the summer.

Kwäday Dän Tsʼìnchi was found with a number of artifacts, including a robe made from 95 pelts of the local arctic ground squirrel (commonly called "gophers") subspecies Spermophilus parryii plesius sewn together with sinew, a woven Tlingit  (root hat) of split spruce root (probably Sitka spruce), a pouch or small bag of beaver fur containing a mass of lichen, mosses and leaves, gaff poles/walking sticks, sticks for carrying salmon, a curved, hooked stick possibly used for setting snares to catch marmots, a "Carved and Painted stick" of unknown purpose, an iron-bladed knife with matching gopher skin sheath, and an atlatl and dart. The use of gopher skins for common household items, robes, and blankets had been important in the past, but the discovery of Kwäday Dän Tsʼìnchi helped revive interest among the Champagne and Aishihik people in teaching and passing on the skills involved, from harvesting the animals to the preparation and the sewing of pelts together. The find also inspired weaving workshops in the Klukwan and Yukon communities for teaching spruce root weaving.

Tissue studies revealed that his long-term diet consisted principally of shellfish and salmon, indicating that he was originally from one of the communities near the Pacific Ocean coast; however, hair samples indicated that his diet over the couple of months before his death had been more strongly meat-based than usual, suggesting that he had spent some time inland. His stomach contents included beach asparagus and he was carrying salmon and shellfish with him, suggesting that he had been back at the coast again and was traveling back inland to the Tatshenshini River at the time of his death.

The tribes allowed samples, including DNA, to be taken for study. They decided to have his remains cremated and scattered over the area where he was discovered. Local clans are considering a memorial potlatch to honour the ancient man.

DNA tests
In 2000, mitochondrial DNA tests of 241 area volunteers of the Champagne and Aishihik First Nations revealed 17 living persons who are related to Kwäday Dän Tsʼìnchi through their direct maternal line. Among them were Sheila Clark and Pearl Callaghan, two of seven sisters. Clark said of finding they were related to Long Ago Man, "It was extremely moving. I couldn't believe it." Fifteen of the 17 individuals identify as Wolf clan, suggesting the man may also have belonged to the Wolf clan. In their matrilineal kinship system, children are considered born into their mother's clan. The individuals were split roughly in half between those who lived in coastal areas and those who lived inland, reflecting historical territories of bands.

A partial mitochondrial DNA sequence of Kwäday Dän Tsʼìnchi, containing information on the hypervariable region HVR2, bases 1 to 360, is available in the National Center for Biotechnology Information's genome sequencing database, GenBank, as accession number AF502945.

Conference
The find and studies generated great interest in Kwäday Dän Tsʼìnchi. In June 2005, the findings were discussed at a science conference on Rapid Landscape Change at Yukon College.

See also 

Arlington Springs Man - 
Buhl Woman - 
Calico Early Man Site - 
Cueva de las Manos  - 
Fort Rock Cave - 
Genetic history of Indigenous peoples of the Americas
Kennewick Man - 
List of unsolved deaths
Luzia Woman - 
Marmes Rockshelter - 
Mummy Cave - 
Paisley Caves  - 
Xá:ytem -

References

1999 archaeological discoveries
Archaeological artifacts
Archaeology of Canada
First Nations history in British Columbia
Mummies
Pre-Columbian archaeology
Pre-Confederation British Columbia people
Southern Tutchone
Tutchone people
Unsolved deaths